Presidential elections were held in Bangladesh on 15 November 1981. The result was a victory for the incumbent acting President Abdus Sattar of the Bangladesh Nationalist Party (BNP), who received 65.5% of the vote, beating his principal challenger Kamal Hossain of the Awami League. Voter turnout was 56.5%.

Background 
In May 1981 the President Ziaur Rahman was assassinated by a faction of officers of the Bangladesh Army. Following the assassination Vice President Abdus Sattar automatically became the acting President of Bangladesh, despite being in hospital at the time. Speaking to foreign reporters in Bangabhaban on 4 June, Satter announced that in line with the constitution, elections would be held within 180 days of the death of the former president, to "foil any conspiracy to disturb the democratic process in the country."

Campaign
According to the New York Times, much of the campaign revolved around the legacy of the two late leaders of the BNP and Awami League, Ziaur Rahman and Sheikh Mujibur Rahman. On the day before the elections, the newspaper reported "Despite the lively participation of 26 candidates, the Bangladesh presidential election campaign that ended here today has been dominated almost entirely by the auras of two dead adversaries. The two - Sheik Mujibur Rahman, who led the country to independence and was killed in 1975, and Gen. Ziaur Rahman, who governed for five years until he was murdered by army officers last May 30 - were the centerpieces at huge rallies that the two major parties staged here in the capital."

Results

Aftermath 
Sattar was overthrown in a bloodless coup d'état in March 1982 by the Army Chief of Staff, Hussain Muhammad Ershad, who assumed the Presidency in 1983, until being deposed himself in a popular mass uprising in 1990.

References

Bangladesh
President
Presidential elections in Bangladesh
Presidential
Election and referendum articles with incomplete results